Arthur Talbot may refer to:

 Arthur Talbot (Royal Navy officer) (1892–1960), Royal Navy officer
 Arthur Newell Talbot (1857–1942), American civil engineer